Homatropine (Equipin, Isopto Homatropine) is an anticholinergic medication that is an antagonist at muscarinic acetylcholine receptors and thus the parasympathetic nervous system.  It is used in eye drops as a cycloplegic (to temporarily paralyze accommodation), and as a mydriatic (to dilate the pupil).

The related chemical compound homatropine methylbromide (methylhomatropine) is a different medication. Homatropine is less potent than atropine and has a shorter duration of action.  It is available as the hydrobromide salt.  Homatropine is also given as an atropine substitute given to reverse the muscarinic and CNS effects associated with indirect cholinomimetic (anti-AChase) administration.

It is on the World Health Organization's List of Essential Medicines.

Side effects
 Blurred vision
 Sensitivity to light

Contraindications
 Untreated glaucoma
 Myasthenia gravis
 Severe heart failure
 Thyrotoxicosis

References

Muscarinic antagonists
Tropanes
Pfizer brands